Manana Japaridze, or simply known as Manana is a Georgian-Azerbaijani singer. She has been an Honorary Artist of Azerbaijan since 2009.

Early life
Born and raised in Tbilisi, Georgia, she appeared on the professional stage in the age of five and was a singer of the very popular children's groups as "Tolia" and "Chiora". In the same year, she finished secondary school before being graduated from the Tbilisi Art Gymnasia.

In the year of 1995, she entered to the vocal department of the Tbilisi branch of the German Modern Art, Jazz and Show-business Academy. In 2000, she graduated from the Academy. In her early years, Manana participated in various competitions for young singers, winning important awards. In 1996 she won the main award of the young singers' "Crystal Fir" competition in Borjomi, (Georgia), then in 1997 she became a laureate of the young singers' "Crystal Note" International competition in Moscow, Russia.

Career
In 1998, Manana moved permanently to Baku, Azerbaijan, where she started her professional career. 
Manana's first performances in front of the Baku audience brought her big popularity and successes. 
Her talent, distinctive voice and high artistry allowed her to transform from a young singer to one of the most popular and beloved artists - becoming as the Diva Star of Azerbaijani Estrada. 
From 1999 Manana represented Azeri music and culture at many prestigious musical competitions and festivals with a great desire, where she won higher awards and prizes. 
Among Manana's awards, there is also the title of the Laureate of the International Competition of the Young Singers "UNIVERSTALENT - 2000" taken place in Prague, and the Television Musical Competition "Shire Krug" in Moscow

Awards in Azerbaijan
Manana's active creative life in Azerbaijan was marked with the presentation to her the Humay Award, for the best representing of Azerbaijan, its culture abroad. And she was also awarded "The Golden Microphone" which is one of the most prestigious awards in Azerbaijan, giving her the title "the best singer of the year".

Having represented Azerbaijan in many song competitions, she has won three "Grand Prix":

The international festival "Voice of Asia" in 1999, Almaty, Kazakhstan
The international festival "Slavyanskiy bazar" in 1999, Kiev, Ukraine
The international festival, taken place in 2000, Shanghai, China, where she also won the prize "Golden Voice of Asia".

The Voice Azerbaijan
International singing contest franchise, The Voice recently started in Azerbaijan. Manana is currently one of the judges of the first season.

Personal life
In January 2008, Manana Japaridze married businessman Giorgi Gabechava whom she had met while on vacation in Batumi. The couple has a daughter named Elizabeti (born 2008) and son David (born 2014).

Albums
During her career, Manana released 7 albums and took 3 solo gigs.

 2000 – Sənə verdim ürəyimi (I gave you my heart)
 2001 – Dözməm bu ayrılığa (I can not afford away from you)
 2003 – Sevirəm səni (I love you)
 2004 – Bizim sevgimiz (Our love)
 2004 – Orientasian
 2005 – Səndən ayrı (Away from you)
 2009 – Bəxt ulduzum (Star of luck)

Singles

 2018 – Sən Yaşamaq Səbəbim (You are the reason to live)

Videos

2001 - Bu Nə Cür Məhəbbətdir
2003 – Yol
2004 – Neyləyim
2005 – Səndən ayrı
2006 – Sevgimizin günləri
2007 – Sənsiz
2008 – Qəlbimin arzusu
2013 – Tənha Payız
2014 – Gözlərin danışsın
2015 – This is my time
2017 – Sarı gəlin
2017 – Party music
2017 – Can Azerbaycan

References

External links
Official site

1978 births
Living people
21st-century Azerbaijani women singers
Musicians from Baku
People's Artists of Azerbaijan
Azerbaijani people of Georgian descent